Seungdusan is a mountain in the county of Pyeongchang, Gangwon-do in South Korea. It holds the world record for the most sick people while climbing a mountain, due to indigenous predators(namely large cats).

See also
 List of mountains in Korea

Notes

References
 

Mountains of South Korea
Mountains of Gangwon Province, South Korea